Zbečno is a municipality and village in Rakovník District in the Central Bohemian Region of the Czech Republic. It has about 600 inhabitants.

Administrative parts
The village of Újezd nad Zbečnem is an administrative part of Zbečno.

Geography
It is located in the Křivoklát Highlands in the Křivoklátsko Landscape Protected Area, which administration have its seat here.

The municipality is situated at the confluence of the Berounka River and Klíčava Stream. Klíčava Reservoir is located on the Klíčava Stream in the northernmost part of the municipal territory.

History
The first written mention of Zbečno is from 1003. After the Křivoklát Castle was built, it became part of the Křivoklát estate.

At the beginning of the 16th century, Zbečno was promoted to a market town by King Vladislaus II, but it was severely damaged in the Thirty Years' War and in the second half of the 17th century, it was again only a village. In 1685, Zbečno was bought by the Waldstein family and ceased to be a royal property.

In 1950–1953, Klíčava Reservoir was built, and Zbečov became a centre of tourism.

Sights
The Romanesque Church of Saint Martin probably existed already at the end of the 11th century. It was gothic rebuilt in the 1470s. In 1714–1716, the church was rebuilt in the Baroque style into its current form.

References

External links

Villages in Rakovník District